Caloptilia zonotarsa is a moth of the family Gracillariidae. It is known from Uttaranchal, India.

The larvae feed on Phoebe lanceolata. They probably mine the leaves of their host plant.

References

zonotarsa
Moths of Asia
Moths described in 1936